"Here Come the Girls" is a song written by Allen Toussaint and originally recorded by Ernie K-Doe and released in 1971. It failed to chart at that time. 

In 2007 the Boots pharmacy chain used the song for two separate television commercials (August 2007; summer 2008). This led to the song re-charting (at #43 for five weeks in the UK; and #48 in 2007 in Ireland and again at #89 for two weeks in 2008). It was this advertisement which the Sugababes heard and subsequently interpolated. After August 2008 it was the Sugababes cover which was used in the Boots advertisements.

In 2008 the Sugababes' version reached No. 3 in the UK and No. 12 in Ireland, and was certified silver by the BPI.

In 2017, Trombone Shorty covered the song.

References

External links
Release; Soul Jazz Records

1970 songs
Songs written by Allen Toussaint